The 2014 Springfield Lasers season was the 19th season of the franchise in World TeamTennis (WTT).

The Lasers won their second consecutive Western Conference championship and met the Washington Kastles in the WTT Championship Match in a rematch of the 2013 Final. For the second straight year, the Lasers fell to the Kastles who won their fourth consecutive King Trophy.

Season recap

Roddick traded
On November 21, 2013, the Lasers announced that they had traded Andy Roddick in exchange for financial consideration to the Austin Aces following the relocation of that franchise from Orange County. Roddick, a resident of Austin, Texas, had expressed a desire to play in his hometown and had invested in the league. Although the WTT press release mentioned that the Lasers and Aces would also swap positions in the Marquee Player Draft (improving the Lasers' draft position), this was not reflected when the league later reported the results of that draft.

Move to Eastern Conference
On February 1, 2014, WTT announced that the Lasers would move to the Eastern Conference, and the New York Sportimes who had relocated and become the San Diego Aviators would move to the Western Conference. Just days later, the Las Vegas Neon was contracted by the league after which WTT decided to keep the Lasers in the Western Conference.

Drafts
With the Lasers winning the Western Conference championship in 2013, they had the next to last pick in each round of both WTT drafts. Prior to the marquee player draft, the Lasers acquired the rights to James Blake from the Boston Lobsters for undisclosed consideration. The Lasers then selected Blake as a protected player in the first round and passed on making a second-round pick. In the roster player draft, the Lasers protected Alisa Kleybanova in the first round and then traded their third-round pick and financial consideration to the Washington Kastles for the Kastles' first-round pick which they used to select Anna-Lena Grönefeld whom had been left unprotected by the San Diego Aviators. In the second round, the Lasers protected Jean-Julien Rojer. The Lasers traded up again in the third round. They sent their fourth round pick and financial consideration to the Aviators for San Diego's third round pick which they used to select 2009 WTT Male Rookie of the Year Michael Russell who was not subject to protection by any team.

Other player transactions
On June 27, 2014, 2013 WTT Female Rookie of the Year Alisa Kleybanova announced she would be unable to play for the Lasers in 2014, due to a shoulder injury. The following day, the Lasers announced that they had signed Olga Govortsova to replace Kleybanova.

On July 5, 2014, the Lasers announced that 2013 WTT Male Most Valuable Player Jean-Julien Rojer would miss the 2014 season with a back injury. With the season starting the following day, the Lasers signed Ross Hutchins to replace Rojer.

On July 8, 2014, the Lasers signed Līga Dekmeijere as a substitute player when it was announced that Anna-Lena Grönefeld would miss the remainder of the season with a hip injury.

On July 10, 2014, the Lasers re-signed Jean Andersen as a substitute player. He had previously played for the Lasers in 2011.

On July 15, 2014, the Lasers signed Raquel Kops-Jones as a substitute player.

On July 19, 2014, the Lasers signed Abigail Spears as a substitute player.

On July 22, 2014, the Lasers signed Fritz Wolmarans as a substitute player.

Early season trouble
The Lasers opened their 2014 season with two home matches and lost them both in super tiebreakers. In the opener on July 6, against the Philadelphia Freedoms, the Lasers had leads of 10–6 and 16–14 before falling 21–20. The following night against the Texas Wild, Michael Russell erased a 15–11 deficit heading to the final set with a 5–1 men's singles set win but fell to Alex Bogomolov, Jr. in the super tiebreaker. After two difficult home losses, the Lasers hit the road to play the Austin Aces on July 8, in the franchise's inaugural home match in Texas after relocating from Orange County. In a match nationally televised by the Tennis Channel, the teams played to 14-all tie through the first four sets, before Vera Zvonareva took the final set of women's singles from Olga Govortsova to give the Aces the victory and drop the Lasers to 0 wins and 3 losses just three days into the season.

Winning streak
The Lasers recorded their first victory of the season on the road against the Boston Lobsters on July 10. They were led by Olga Govortsova who registered a 5–0 set win in women's singles and teamed with Līga Dekmeijere for a 5–1 set win in women's doubles. Michael Russell had a 5–1 set win in men's singles over former Laser Rik de Voest. Two nights later, the Lasers returned home for a rematch with the Texas Wild. The Wild raced to a 10–5 lead after two sets, but Govortsova teamed with James Blake for a 5–2 set win in mixed doubles and with Dekmeijere for a 5–1 set win in women's doubles to give the Lasers a 15–13 lead heading to the final set of men's singles. Alex Bogomolov, Jr. prevailed over Russell, 5–3, to send the match to a super tiebreaker. With the tiebreaker game tied at 6, Russell won the match-deciding point to give the Lasers a 19–18 victory. The Austin Aces came to Springfield the following night, and it was Govortsova who led the Lasers to victory once again. She won the women's singles set, 5–1, and partnered with Dekmeijere for a 5–2 set win in women's doubles and with Blake for a 5–0 set win in mixed doubles. The win evened the Lasers' record at 3 wins and 3 losses.

Another winning streak
After two road losses dropped the Lasers' record to 3 wins and 5 losses, they returned home to meet the San Diego Aviators on July 17. Ross Hutchins and Michael Russell got the Lasers started with a 5–2 set win in men's doubles. After dropping the next two sets, the Lasers found themselves behind, 12–8. Olga Govortsova won the women's singles set, 5–3, and Russell won the men's singles set by the same score to send the match to a super tiebreaker which Russell took, 7–2, to give the Lasers a 19–18 victory. The following night, the three-time defending champion Washington Kastles came to town. The Lasers dominated them, winning four of the five sets. Hutchins teamed with Russell for a 5–2 set win in men's doubles and with Govortsova for a 5–1 set win in mixed doubles. Govortsova and Raquel Kops-Jones won the women's doubles set, 5–1. Russell took the men's singles set, 5–1. The resulting 24–10 defeat for the Kastles was the worst loss in their franchise history. On July 19, the Lasers took all five sets in a 25–16 road win over the Texas Wild. Govortsova earned a set win in women's singles, 5–4, and teamed with Hutchins for a 5–4 set win in mixed doubles and with Abigail Spears (making her Lasers debut) for a 5–2 women's doubles set win. Russell won the men's singles set, 5–2, and partnered with Hutchins in men's doubles for a 5–4 set win. With heir third straight victory, the Lasers improved their record to 6 wins and 5 losses.

Lasers clinch a playoff berth
After consecutive road losses in San Diego and Washington, the Lasers entered the final day of the regular season with 6 wins and 7 losses, but nevertheless in control of their own destiny; a win would put them into the playoffs. The Lasers responded by taking all five sets in a dominant 25–7 home victory over the Boston Lobsters. Olga Govortsova won the women's singles set, 5–0, and teamed with Abigail Spears for another 5–0 set win in women's doubles. Spears and Ross Hutchins took the mixed doubles set, 5–2. Hutchins and Michael Russell opened the match with a 5–2 set win in men's doubles. Russell sealed the victory with a 5–4 men's singles set win and gave the Lasers their second consecutive playoff berth.

Second consecutive Western Conference title
The Lasers went on the road to face the San Diego Aviators, the league's best team in the regular season, in the Western Conference Championship Match. Michael Russell got the Lasers started with a 5–4 set win in men's singles. The Aviators took the women's doubles set to tie the score at 9 and then the mixed doubles set to take a 14–12 lead. Olga Govortsova's dominant 5–0 set win in women's doubles put the Lasers in front, 17–14, heading to the final set of men's doubles. Russell and Ross Hutchins held off the formidable Bryan brothers for a 5–3 set win that gave the Lasers a 22–17 victory and their second consecutive Western Conference Championship.

WTT Final
On July 27, the Lasers met the Washington Kastles in the WTT Final for the second consecutive year. Although the match was in Springfield, because WTT predetermined that the Western Conference champion would host the Final, the Kastles, as the higher seed, were treated as the "home" team in determining order of play. The Kastles won all five sets en route to their fourth consecutive title, They were led by Martina Hingis who was named WTT Finals Most Valuable Player after earning a 5–2 win over Olga Govortsova in the second set of women's singles, teaming with Anastasia Rodionova for a 5–1 win over Govortsova and Līga Dekmeijere in the fourth set of women's doubles and closing out the match with Leander Paes with a 5–4 mixed doubles set win over Govortsova and Ross Hutchins.

Event chronology
 November 21, 2013: The Lasers traded Andy Roddick to the Austin Aces for financial consideration.
 February 11, 2014: The Lasers traded for James Blake and selected him in the WTT Marquee Player Draft.
 March 11, 2014: The Lasers protected Alisa Kleybanova and Jean-Julien Rojer in the WTT Roster Player Draft. The Lasers traded their third round pick (20th overall) and financial consideration for the Washington Kastles' first-round pick (seventh overall) which they used to draft Anna-Lena Grönefeld. The Lasers traded their fourth round pick (27th overall) and financial consideration for the San Diego Aviators' third round pick (15th overall) which they used to draft Michael Russell.
 June 28, 2014: The Lasers signed Olga Govortsova to replace the injured Alisa Kleybanova.
 July 5, 2014: The Lasers signed Ross Hutchins to replace the injured Jean-Julien Rojer.
 July 8, 2014: The Lasers signed Līga Dekmeijere as a substitute player.
 July 10, 2014: The Lasers signed Jean Andersen as a substitute player.
 July 15, 2014: The Lasers signed Raquel Kops-Jones as a substitute player.
 July 19, 2014: The Lasers signed Abigail Spears as a substitute player.
 July 22, 2014: The Lasers signed Fritz Wolmarans as a substitute player.
 July 23, 2014: The Lasers clinched their second consecutive playoff berth with a 25–7 victory over the Boston Lobsters.
 July 24, 2014: The Lasers won their second consecutive Western Conference Championship with a 22–17 victory over the San Diego Aviators.
 July 27, 2014: The Lasers lost the WTT Final to the Washington Kastles, 25–13.

Draft picks
Since the Lasers won the Western Conference championship in 2013, they had the next to last selection in each round of both WTT drafts.

Marquee player draft
The Lasers protected James Blake after acquiring him in a trade with the Boston Lobsters. The selections made by the Lasers are shown in the table below.

Roster player draft
The Lasers traded up twice in the roster player draft to select Anna-Lena Grönefeld in the first round and Michael Russell in the third round. First, the Lasers traded their third round pick (20th overall) and financial consideration for the Washington Kastles' first-round pick (seventh overall). Next, the Lasers traded their fourth round pick (27th overall) and financial consideration for the San Diego Aviators' third round pick (15th overall). The selections made by the Lasers are shown in the table below.

Match log

Regular season
{| align="center" border="1" cellpadding="2" cellspacing="1" style="border:1px solid #aaa"
|-
! colspan="2" style="background:#744184; color:white" | Legend
|-
! bgcolor="ccffcc" | Lasers Win
! bgcolor="ffbbbb" | Lasers Loss
|-
! colspan="2" | Home team in CAPS
|}

Playoffs
{| align="center" border="1" cellpadding="2" cellspacing="1" style="border:1px solid #aaa"
|-
! colspan="2" style="background:#744184; color:white" | Legend
|-
! bgcolor="ccffcc" | Lasers Win
! bgcolor="ffbbbb" | Lasers Loss
|-
! colspan="2" | Home team in CAPS
|}
Western Conference Championship Match
{| class="wikitable" style="text-align:left"
|-
!style="background:#744184; color:white" width="60px"| Date
!style="background:#744184; color:white" width="175px"| Venue and location
!style="background:#744184; color:white" width="600px"| Result and details
|- bgcolor="CCFFCC"
| July 24 || Valley View Casino CenterSan Diego, California || Springfield Lasers 22, SAN DIEGO AVIATORS 17<small>* MS: Michael Russell (Lasers) 5, Somdev Devvarman (Aviators) 4* WD: Květa Peschke/Daniela Hantuchová (Aviators) 5, Olga Govortsova/Līga Dekmeijere (Lasers) 4* XD: Bob Bryan/Květa Peschke (Aviators) 5, Ross Hutchins/Olga Govortsova (Lasers) 3* WS: Olga Govortsova (Lasers) 5, Daniela Hantuchová (Aviators) 0* MD: Michael Russell/Ross Hutchins (Lasers) 5, Bob Bryan/Mike Bryan (Aviators) 3</small>
|}
World TeamTennis Championship MatchNote:Team personnel
Reference:

On-court personnel
  John-Laffnie de Jager – Head Coach
  Jean Andersen
  James Blake
  Līga Dekmeijere
  Olga Govortsova
  Anna-Lena Grönefeld
  Ross Hutchins
  Alisa Kleybanova (injured, did not play)
  Raquel Kops-Jones
  Jean-Julien Rojer (injured, did not play)
  Michael Russell
  Abigail Spears
  Fritz Wolmarans

Front office
 Springfield-Greene County Park Board (represented by John Cooper) – Owner
 Bob Belote – Director
 Paul Nahon – General ManagerNotes:Statistics
Players are listed in order of their game-winning percentage provided they played in at least 40% of the Lasers' games in that event, which is the WTT minimum for qualification for league leaders in individual statistical categories.

Men's singles – regular season

Women's singles – regular season

Men's doubles – regular season

Women's doubles – regular season

Mixed doubles – regular season

Team totals – regular season

Men's singles – playoffs

Women's singles – playoffs

Men's doubles – playoffs

Women's doubles – playoffs

Mixed doubles – playoffs

Team totals – playoffs

Men's singles – all matches

Women's singles – all matches

Men's doubles – all matches

Women's doubles – all matches

Mixed doubles – all matches

Team totals – all matches

Transactions
 November 21, 2013: The Lasers traded Andy Roddick to the Austin Aces for financial consideration.
 February 11, 2014: The Lasers acquired James Blake in a trade with the Boston Lobsters for undisclosed consideration and then protected him in the WTT Marquee Player Draft.
 March 11, 2014: During the WTT Roster Player Draft, the Lasers traded their third round pick (20th overall) and financial consideration for the Washington Kastles' first-round pick (seventh overall) which they used to draft Anna-Lena Grönefeld. The Lasers also traded their fourth round pick (27th overall) and financial consideration for the San Diego Aviators' third round pick (15th overall) which they used to draft Michael Russell. The Lasers also selected Alisa Kleybanova and Jean-Julien Rojer as protected picks in the draft.
 March 11, 2014: The Lasers left Vania King and Rik de Voest unprotected in the WTT Roster Player Draft. De Voest was selected in the fourth round by the Boston Lobsters.
 June 27, 2014: The Lasers signed Olga Govortsova as an injury-replacement roster player.
 July 5, 2014: The Lasers signed Ross Hutchins as an injury-replacement roster player.
 July 8, 2014: The Lasers signed Līga Dekmeijere as a substitute player.
 July 10, 2014: The Lasers signed Jean Andersen as a substitute player.
 July 15, 2014: The Lasers signed Raquel Kops-Jones as a substitute player.
 July 19, 2014: The Lasers signed Abigail Spears as a substitute player.
 July 22, 2014''': The Lasers signed Fritz Wolmarans as a substitute player.

Individual achievements
Michael Russell led WTT in game-winning percentage in men's singles.

Olga Govortsova was fourth in WTT in game-winning percentage in mixed doubles and fifth in women's doubles.

Charitable support
During each night of the 2014 season, the WTT team with the most aces received US$1,000 toward a local charity of the team's choice as part of a program called Mylan Aces. In the case of a tie, the award was split accordingly. The Lasers earned $1,000 for the Springfield-Greene County Park Board Scholarship Fund through the program.

See also

References

External links
Springfield Lasers official website
World TeamTennis official website

Springfield Lasers season
Springfield Lasers 2014